Leo A. McAdam (born c. 1930) is Canadian former politician. He served in the Legislative Assembly of New Brunswick from 1987 to 1995 as a Liberal member from the constituency of Saint John North.

References

1930s births
Living people
20th-century Canadian politicians
20th-century Canadian businesspeople
New Brunswick Liberal Association MLAs
People from Queens County, Prince Edward Island